Chen Sisi or Sisi Chen is the name of:

 Chen Sisi (actress), Chinese actress
 Chen Sisi (singer), Chinese singer

See also
 Sisy Chen, Taiwanese politician